Slovak Men's Volleyball League (Slovak: Volejbalová extraliga mužov) is the top-level volleyball league in Slovakia. The current champion for 2015/16 season is VK Bystrina SPU Nitra after winning 4-3 against VK Mirad PU Prešov.

Champions

References

Slovakia
Volleyball competitions in Slovakia
Sports leagues established in 1992
1992 establishments in Slovakia
Professional sports leagues in Slovakia